Bryolymnia picturata is a moth of the family Noctuidae first described by William Schaus in 1894. It is found in south-eastern Mexico.

External links

Hadeninae
Moths described in 1894